Nikita Aleksandrovich Bazhenov (born 1 February 1985) is a Russian former association footballer who played as a striker.

Club career
He made one appearance in 2006–07 UEFA Champions League.

International career
Bazhenov made his debut for Russia on 20 August 2008 in a friendly against the Netherlands.

Career statistics

References

External links
 UEFA profile
 Player profile 

1985 births
Association football forwards
FC Saturn Ramenskoye players
FC Spartak Moscow players
FC Tom Tomsk players
FC Okzhetpes players
FC Olimp-Dolgoprudny players
Living people
People from Noginsky District
Russia youth international footballers
Russia under-21 international footballers
Russia international footballers
Russian footballers
Russian Premier League players
Russian First League players
Russian Second League players
Kazakhstan First Division players
Russian expatriate footballers
Expatriate footballers in Kazakhstan
Russian expatriate sportspeople in Kazakhstan
Sportspeople from Moscow Oblast